David Stanmore Shepherd (born 3 August 1956) is an Australian sportsman who played Victorian Football League football with St Kilda and cricket for Victoria.

Shepherd was recruited to St Kilda from Brighton Grammar and played four senior games with the club, two in 1976 and another two in 1977. The only goal of his career was kicked in a game against South Melbourne.

In the 1982–83 Australian cricket season he made his debut for Victoria in a one day match against the touring Sri Lankan cricket team. His 43 not out from the middle order guided his side a six wicket victory. Two weeks later he made his Sheffield Shield debut, managing scores of 17 and 2 in a loss to South Australia, his only first-class match.

See also
 List of Victoria first-class cricketers

References

External links

1956 births
Living people
St Kilda Football Club players
Australian cricketers
Victoria cricketers
Melbourne Cricket Club cricketers
People educated at Brighton Grammar School
Australian rules footballers from Melbourne
Cricketers from Melbourne